Raymond Wadsworth Walters (August 25, 1885 - October 25, 1970) was president of the University of Cincinnati for a term longer than any other president, from 1932 to 1955. Walters complied annual college enrollment surveys which were widely reported across the nation to show changes in college enrollments.

Walter's published works include a book on the life of Stephen Foster (specifically an account of his years spent in Cincinnati) titled "Youth's Golden Gleam".

References

External links
 Grace, Kevin "Raymond Walters Redux", University of Cincinnati LiBlog

 

1885 births
1970 deaths
University of Cincinnati alumni
Presidents of the University of Cincinnati
20th-century American academics